Mark O'Leary (born 1977) is an Irish hurler who played as a right wing-forward for the Tipperary senior team.

O'Leary joined the team during the 1999 championship and was a regular member of the team until his retirement after the 2005 championship. During that time he won one All-Ireland winners' medal, one Munster winners' medal and two National Hurling League winners' medals (1999, 2001).

At club level O'Leary continued to play with Kilruane MacDonagh's.

O'Leary is a former manager of the Tipperary minor hurling team.

References

1977 births
Living people
Kilruane MacDonaghs hurlers
Tipperary inter-county hurlers
Munster inter-provincial hurlers
All-Ireland Senior Hurling Championship winners
Hurling managers